Christopher Merlin Vyvyan Holland (born December 1945) is a British biographer and editor. He is the only grandchild of Oscar Wilde, whose life he has researched and written about extensively.

Biography
Born in London in December 1945, Christopher Merlin Vyvyan Holland is the son of the author Vyvyan Holland and his second wife, Thelma Besant. He is the only grandchild of Oscar Wilde and Constance Lloyd.  

His mother Thelma was an Australian cosmetician who became the personal beauty adviser to Queen Elizabeth II for about 10 years from the mid-1940s. His paternal grandmother, Constance, had changed her and her children's surname to Holland (an old family name) in 1895, after Wilde had been convicted of homosexual acts and imprisoned, in order to gain some privacy for the boys and distance from the scandal.

Work
Holland has studied and researched Wilde's life for more than thirty years. He is the co-editor, with Rupert Hart-Davis, of The Complete Letters of Oscar Wilde. He is the editor of Irish Peacock and Scarlet Marquess, the first uncensored version of his grandfather's 1895 trials.  (The book is titled The Real Trial of Oscar Wilde for release in the US.) 

Holland has criticised Richard Ellmann's 1987 biography, Oscar Wilde, as inaccurate, particularly his claim that Wilde had syphilis and transmitted it to Constance. According to The Guardian, Holland has  "unearthed medical evidence within private family letters, which has enabled a doctor to determine the likely cause of Constance's death. The letters reveal symptoms nowadays associated with multiple sclerosis but apparently wrongly diagnosed by her two doctors. One, an unnamed German 'nerve doctor', resorted to dubious remedies and the other, Luigi Maria Bossi, conducted a botched operation that days later claimed her life."

Holland has also written The Wilde Album, a small volume that included hitherto unpublished photographs of Wilde. The book focuses on how the scandal caused by Wilde's trials affected his family, most notably his wife, Constance, and their children, Cyril and Vyvyan.  

In 2006, his book Oscar Wilde: A Life in Letters was published, and his volume Coffee with Oscar Wilde, an imagined conversation with Wilde, was released in the autumn of 2007. Holland also wrote A Portrait of Oscar Wilde (2008), which reveals Wilde through manuscripts and letters from the Lucia Moreira Salles collection, located at The Morgan Library & Museum in New York City.

In addition, Holland has also worked as a wine writer and occasionally written features for Country Life, and The Oldie. 

In July 2013, Holland gave the keynote address for a symposium on Oscar Wilde presented by The Santa Fe Opera. The address surveyed the popular and critical attitudes towards Wilde and his work from the end of his life to the present day. The symposium was given in conjunction with the opera company's world premiere presentations of Oscar, composed by Theodore Morrison with a libretto written by John Cox and the composer.

Holland's play The Trials of Oscar Wilde, co-authored with John O'Connor and re-enacting the 1895 trials of Lord Queensberry for libel and Oscar Wilde for gross indecency, toured the United Kingdom in 2014 in a production by the European Arts Company.

Personal life
Holland lives in Burgundy, France, with his second wife. His son, Lucian Holland (born 1979 to Merlin's first wife Sarah), studied classics at Magdalen College. He occupied rooms that his great-grandfather Wilde had occupied. He is a computer programmer, living in London. 

Merlin Holland briefly toyed with the idea of changing his name back to Wilde. He told The New York Times in 1998, “But if I did it, it would have to be not just for Oscar, but for his father and mother, too, for the whole family. It was an extraordinary family before he came along, so if I put the family name back on the map for the right reasons, then it's all right.”

Published works
1998 – The Wilde Album
2003 – Irish Peacock and Scarlet Marquess: The Real Trial of Oscar Wilde
2004 – The Real Trial of Oscar Wilde

References

Citations

General references
Holland, Vyvyan (Merlin Holland, Ed.), Son of Oscar Wilde. London: Carroll & Graf, 1999. 2nd Edition.
Nick Stafford (writer), David Hunter (director), The Real Trial of Oscar Wilde, based on Irish Peacock and Scarlet Marquess and broadcast for the first time on BBC Radio 4 as a Saturday Drama on 28 June 2014.

External links
Moss, Stephen, "The importance of being Merlin", The Guardian (London), 24 November 2000. (Profile of Holland on the publication of the new edition of Wilde's letters)
Wheatcroft, Geoffrey, "The Picture of Dorian Gray is complete tosh", The Guardian (London), 24 November 2000. (Commentary on Wilde's importance)

1945 births
English biographers
English people of Irish descent
Living people
Oscar Wilde
Writers from London
English expatriates in France